Richard Dickson Cudahy (February 2, 1926 – September 22, 2015) was an American business executive, law professor, and United States circuit judge of the United States Court of Appeals for the Seventh Circuit.

Education and career

Born in Milwaukee, Wisconsin, Cudahy was educated at the Canterbury School and received a Bachelor of Science degree from the United States Military Academy at West Point, New York in 1948, and a Juris Doctor from Yale Law School in 1955. He was a Lieutenant in the United States Air Force from 1948 to 1951. He was a law clerk for Judge Charles Edward Clark of the United States Court of Appeals for the Second Circuit from 1955 to 1956. He was an assistant to the legal adviser for the United States Department of State from 1956 to 1957. He was in private practice in Chicago, Illinois from 1957 to 1960. He was a President and C.E.O. of Patrick Cudahy, Inc., Cudahy and Milwaukee, Wisconsin from 1961 to 1971. He returned to private practice in Milwaukee in 1972, serving also as a member and chairman of the Public Service Commission of Wisconsin from 1972 to 1975, then continuing his private practice in Washington, D.C. from 1976 to 1979. He also taught as a lecturer at Marquette University Law School from 1961 to 1966, as a visiting professor of law at the University of Wisconsin Law School from 1966 to 1967, and as a lecturer at the George Washington University Law School from 1976 to 1979.

Federal judicial service

On May 22, 1979, Cudahy was nominated by President Jimmy Carter to a new seat on the United States Court of Appeals for the Seventh Circuit, created by 92 Stat. 1629, 1632. He was confirmed by the United States Senate on September 25, 1979, and received his commission on September 26, 1979. He assumed senior status on August 15, 1994. His service terminated on September 22, 2015 due to his death.

In 2000, two members of Congress complained that Cudahy leaked confidential information prior to the presidential nomination of Al Gore.

Personal life

In 1956, Cudahy married Ann Featherston, who died in 1974. In 1976, he married Janet Stuart. He had seven children. He died on September 22, 2015 at his home in Winnetka, Illinois.

Notable decisions

 Leibovitz v. Paramount Pictures Corp., 137 F.3d 109 (2d Cir. 1998)
 MCI Communications Corp. v. American Tel. and Tel. Co. 708 F.2d 1081 (7th Cir. 1983)
 Brownmark Films, LLC v. Comedy Partners, 682 F.3d 687 (7th Cir. 2012)
 World Outreach Conference Center and Pamela Blossom v. City of Chicago, Nos. 13-3669, 13-3728 (2d Cir. June 1, 2015)

References

External links
 
 

|-

1926 births
2015 deaths
Judges of the United States Court of Appeals for the Seventh Circuit
Lawyers from Milwaukee
People from Winnetka, Illinois
Military personnel from Milwaukee
United States Army Air Forces officers
United States Military Academy alumni
United States court of appeals judges appointed by Jimmy Carter
20th-century American judges
Yale Law School alumni
Marquette University faculty
George Washington University Law School faculty
University of Wisconsin Law School faculty
Cudahy family
Canterbury School (Connecticut) alumni